Selenia is a genus of moths in the family Geometridae erected by Jacob Hübner in 1823. In 1999, there were about twenty-four species in the genus.

Species
Selenia alciphearia Walker, 1860 - brown-tipped thorn, northern selenia
Selenia cacocore Dyar, 1918
Selenia dentaria (Fabricius, 1775) - early thorn
Selenia eucore Dyar, 1918
Selenia gynaecon Dyar, 1918
Selenia kentaria (Grote & Robinson, 1867) - Kent's geometer
Selenia lunularia (Hübner, 1788) - lunar thorn
Selenia sordida (Leech, 1897)
Selenia tetralunaria (Hufnagel, 1767) - purple thorn

References

Ennomini
Taxa named by Jacob Hübner